Chemistry is a Pakistani Urdu-language drama serial that premiered on Geo Entertainment on 8 October 2010, directed by Syed Ahmad Kamran. The main cast includes Sanam Baloch, Faisal Rehman, Iffat Umar and Danish Taimoor. The drama's tag line reads 'Chemistry, subject of love'.

Plot
Chemistry focuses on relationships, how the slightest change in the chemicals can lead to a dangerous result. In this case, it's the brain chemicals that are placed under consideration. The four characters whose lives intermingle are Ramis, Raina and their teacher, Professor Waqar and his wife Maryam.

Cast 
 Sanam Baloch as Rania
 Danish Taimoor as Ramis
 Faisal Rehman as Prof. Waqar
 Iffat Rahim as Maryam
 Humaira Zaheer as Kiran
 Hina Dilpazeer
 Uroosa Siddiqui
 Syed Nabeel
 Saqib Khan
 Asad Zamaan
 Shehzad Jawed
 Shireen Khan

Title songs
The opening sequence, Akhiyon Ki Jholi is sung by Indian vocalist Rekha Bhardwaj and composed by Vishal Bhardwaj. Another main theme in the serial is the song Zindagi Chocolate Hai, which is sung by the main character, Sanam Baloch.

References

External links
 

2010 Pakistani television series debuts
Geo TV original programming
Pakistani drama television series
Urdu-language television shows